Käina is a small borough in Hiiu County on the island of Hiiumaa in Estonia, located near the north shore of Käina Bay. Prior to the administrative reform of Estonian municipalities in 2017, Käina was the administrative center of Käina Parish.

Notable people
Endel Kiisa (born 1937), motorcycle racer
Ada Lundver (1942–2011), actress, singer 
Elmar Tampõld (born 1920), Estonian-Canadian architect, was born in Käina
Rudolf Tobias (1873–1918), composer, was born and lived in a house just west of Käina in nowadays Selja village.

Gallery

References

External links

Boroughs and small boroughs in Estonia
Kreis Wiek